Cyathocrinites is an extinct genus of crinoids that lived from the Early Silurian to the Late Permian in Europe and North America.

Sources 

 Fossils (Smithsonian Handbooks) by David Ward (Page 167)

External links 
Cyathocrinites in the Paleobiology Database

Cladida
Prehistoric crinoid genera
Silurian crinoids
Devonian crinoids
Carboniferous crinoids
Permian crinoids
Paleozoic echinoderms of Europe
Paleozoic echinoderms of North America
Llandovery first appearances
Lopingian genus extinctions
Fossil taxa described in 1821
Paleozoic life of Alberta